Adam Charles Kunkel (born February 24, 1981) is a male hurdler from Canada, who twice represented his native country at the Pan American Games: 2003 and 2007. He set his personal best (48.24) in the men's 400 m hurdles event on July 27, 2007 in Rio de Janeiro.

He was seventh at the 2003 Pan American Games and competed in the heats at the 2003 World Championships in Athletics. He took the 400 m hurdles gold at the 2007 Pan American Games and reached the final at the 2007 World Championships, although he failed to finish in the final.

Achievements

See also
 Canadian records in track and field

Notes

External links
 
 
 
 Canadian runner Adam Charles Kunkel and US Laron Bennet celebrate... News Photo - Getty Images

1981 births
Living people
Canadian male sprinters
Canadian male hurdlers
Athletes (track and field) at the 2003 Pan American Games
Athletes (track and field) at the 2007 Pan American Games
Sportspeople from Ontario
Pan American Games medalists in athletics (track and field)
Pan American Games gold medalists for Canada
World Athletics Championships athletes for Canada
Medalists at the 2007 Pan American Games
21st-century Canadian people